The Lyceum is a historic museum and event space in Alexandria, Virginia. Built in 1839 on the initiative of Quaker schoolmaster Benjamin Hallowell, it has been listed on the National Register of Historic Places since May 27, 1969, the year of its purchase by the city.

Constructed in the then-popular Greek Revival style from bricks recycled from the original St. Mary chapel, it originally was intended as a permanent home for scholarly activities. It hosted both the Alexandria Lyceum (which featured speakers including John Quincy Adams) and the Alexandria Library. During the American Civil War, it served as a hospital. After the war, the Lyceum was dissolved and John Bathurst Daingerfield bought the building for his daughter Mary Helen and her husband, Philip Hooe, who was a descendant of the town's first mayor, merchant Robert Townshend Hooe. It later served as an office building, so virtually none of the original woodwork remains. During the New Deal it was recognized by the Historic American Buildings Survey (HABS). In 1937, a separate building was constructed about four blocks north (on the site of the former Quaker graveyard) to house the growing city's library, which was the scene of a sit-in in 1942 and now is one of several branches.

Today the Lyceum, whose two-story Doric portico fronts Washington Street (an urban section of the George Washington Memorial Parkway), is a visitor's center and museum in its own right (complete with gift shop). It also again hosts various scholarly and cultural events and lectures, as well as administrative offices of the Office of Historic Alexandria. That department of the city's government is charged with conserving, interpreting and promoting this and seven other relatively small museums which bring the city's varied history to life. The Office of Historic Alexandria is accredited by the American Alliance of Museums and is a member of the International Coalition of Sites of Conscience.

Gallery

See also
National Register of Historic Places listings in Alexandria, Virginia

References

External links

Event venues on the National Register of Historic Places in Virginia
Infrastructure completed in 1839
National Register of Historic Places in Alexandria, Virginia
Greek Revival houses in Virginia
Buildings and structures in Alexandria, Virginia
Museums in Alexandria, Virginia
History museums in Virginia
Historic American Buildings Survey in Virginia